A total lunar eclipse took place on Monday, April 24, 1967, the first of two total lunar eclipses in 1967, the second being on October 18, 1967.

This lunar eclipse is first of a tetrad, four total lunar eclipses in series. The following tetrad is in 1985 and 1986, starting with a May 1985 lunar eclipse.

The Surveyor 3 probe landed on the moon during this eclipse.

More details about the Total Lunar Eclipse of 24 April 1967.

Date = 24 April 1967

Penumbral Magnitude = 2.28924

Umbral Magnitude = 1.33559

Gamma = 0.29722

Greatest Eclipse = 24 April 1967 at 12:06:26.3 UTC

Ecliptic Opposition = 24 April 1967 at 12:03:24.0 UTC

Equatorial Opposition = 24 April 1967 at 11:51:47.1 UTC

Sun position 
Right ascension: 2.09

Declination: 12.7

Moon position 
Right ascension: 14.1

Declination: -12.5

Visibility
It was visible from Asia, Australia, Pacific Ocean, North America, South America and Antarctica.

Related lunar eclipses

Lunar year series

Tritos series

Tzolkinex 
 Preceded: Lunar eclipse of March 13, 1960
 Followed: Lunar eclipse of June 4, 1974

Saros series 
It was part of Saros series 121.

Metonic series
This eclipse is the third of four Metonic cycle lunar eclipses on the same date, April 23–24, each separated by 19 years:

Half-Saros cycle
A lunar eclipse will be preceded and followed by solar eclipses by 9 years and 5.5 days (a half saros). This lunar eclipse is related to two annular solar eclipses of Solar Saros 128.

See also
List of lunar eclipses
List of 20th-century lunar eclipses

Notes

External links

1967-04
1967 in science
April 1967 events